Laïko or laïkó ( [tragoúdi], ; “[song] of the people", "popular [song]", pl:  laïká [tragoúdia]) is a Greek music genre composed in Greek language in accordance with the tradition of the Greek people. Also called "folk song" or "urban folk music" ( astikí laïkí mousikí), in its plural form is a Greek music genre which has taken many forms over the years. Laïkó followed after the commercialization of Rebetiko music. It is strongly dominated by Greek folk music and it is used to describe Greek popular music as a whole. When used in context, it refers mostly to the form it took in the period from the 1950s to the 1980s.

Rebetiko and elafró tragoudi
Until the 1930s the Greek discography was dominated by two musical genres: the Greek folk music ( dimotiká) and the elafró tragoudi (literally: "light[weight] song"). The latter was represented by ensembles of singers/musicians or solo artists like Attik and Nikos Gounaris. It was the Greek version of the international popular music of the era. In the 1930s the first rebetiko recordings had a massive impact on Greek music. As Markos Vamvakaris stated, "we were the first to record laïká (popular) songs". In the years to follow this type of music, the first form of what is now called laïkó tragoúdi, became the mainstream Greek music.

Classic laïkó

Classic laïkó as it is known today, was the mainstream popular music of Greece during the
1960s and 1970s. Laiko music evolved from the traditional Greek music of the ancient and the medieval Greek era and was established until the present day. Laïkó was dominated by singers such as Nikos Xanthopoulos and composers such as Mimis Plessas. Among the most significant songwriters and lyricists of this period are George Zambetas and the big names of the Rebetiko era that were still in business, like Vassilis Tsitsanis and Manolis Chiotis. Many artists combined the traditions of éntekhno and laïkó with considerable success, such as the composers Stavros Xarchakos and Mimis Plessas. Legendary figures associated with Laiko (specifically Zeimpekiko) are Dimitris Mitropanos and Stelios Kazantzidis.

Contemporary laïkó
Contemporary laïkó ( sýnchrono laïkó ), also called modern laïkó or laïko-pop, can be called in Greece the mainstream music genre, with variations in plural form as contemporary laïká. Along with moderna laïkó, it is currently Greece's mainstream music genre. The main cultural Greek dances and rhythms of today's Greek music culture laïká are Nisiotika, Syrta, Antikristos, Rebetika, Hasapiko, Zeibekiko, Kalamatianos, Kangeli and Syrtaki.

The more cheerful version of laïkó, called elafró laïkó, was often used in musicals during the Golden Age of Greek cinema. The Greek Peiraiotes superstar Tolis Voskopoulos gave the after-modern version of Greek laïko listenings. Many artists have combined the traditions of éntekhno and laïkó with considerable success, such as the composers Mimis Plessas and Stavros Xarchakos.

Contemporary laïká emerged as a style in the early 1980s. An indispensable part of the contemporary laïká culture is the písta (pl. ; "dance floor/venue"). Night clubs at which the DJs play only contemporary laïká where colloquially known on the 90s as ellinádika. Modern laïkó is mainstream Greek laïkó music mixed in with modern Western influences, from such international mainstream genres as pop music and dance. Renowned songwriters or lyricists of contemporary laïká include Alekos Chrysovergis, Nikos Karvelas, Phoebus, Nikos Terzis, Giorgos Theofanous and Evi Droutsa.

Terminology

In effect, there is no single name for contemporary laïká in the Greek language, but it is
however also used for denoting newly composed songs in the tradition of "proper" laïkó; when
ambiguity arises,  ("contemporary")  or disparagingly  (laïko-pop, "folk-pop", also
in the sense of "westernized") is used for the former, while  (gnísio, "proper, genuine,
true") or even  (katharóaimo, "pureblood")  is used for the latter. The choice of contrasting
the notions of "westernized" and "genuine" may often be based on ideological and aesthetic grounds. Laïko interacted more westernized sounds in the late of 2000s. The term modern laïká comes from the phrase , "modern songs of the people".

Criticism
Despite its immense popularity, the genre of contemporary laïká (especially laïko-pop) has come under scrutiny for "featuring musical clichés, average singing voices and slogan-like lyrics" and for "being a hybrid, neither laïkó, nor pop".

See also
Rebetiko
Greek folk music
Nightclubs in Greece
Music of Lebanon
Chalga

Notes

Greek music
Folk music genres
Pop music genres